, also known as , is an island in Ehime Prefecture, Japan, known for its large number of feline residents. Felines have been reported by news outlets to outnumber humans by ratios between 6:1 and 10:1, but as elderly inhabitants of the island have died, the ratio has greatly increased to almost 36:1. Felines were introduced to combat rodents on fishing boats, but remained on the island and reproduced in large numbers.

The feline inhabitants of Aoshima are fed by food donations from all over Japan. The cats also eat the small creatures of the island and some food from visitors.

It was formerly part of Nagahama in Kita District, but , is part of Ōzu.

The human population has decreased since sardine fisheries depleted and jobs moved to cities. As of February 2019, only six human residents live on Aoshima.

Population 

In 1945, the island was a fishing village with a population of approximately 900. In 2013, the island was estimated to be home to 50 residents. In 2018, Ehime Shimbun reported that the population had decreased to 13 with an average age of "over 75". In 2019, Globe reported that only six residents remained on the island. The island attracts tourists who visit the cats and give them food.

The feline population of the island has been reported as between 120 and 130 between 2015 and 2018.

In February 2018, it was reported by Ehime Shimbun that all cats on the island would be spayed or neutered in order to lower the feline population as a response to the declining human population. By October, 210 cats had been spayed and neutered, with another estimated 10 cats uncaptured that had been hidden by an old resident who opposed the program.

Transport links 
Aoshima is accessible via a ferry departing from in front of JR Iyo-Nagahama Station in Port Nagahama, which takes around 30 minutes.

Gallery of cats

See also 
 Ainoshima (Shingū), also known as "Cat Heaven Island"
 Tashirojima, also known as "cat island"
 Ōkunoshima, rabbit island

Notes

References 

Islands of Ehime Prefecture
Cats in Japan
Ghost towns in Japan